IFLA may refer to:

International Federation of Library Associations and Institutions
International Federation of Landscape Architects